The 21st United States Congress was a meeting of the legislative branch of the United States federal government, consisting of the United States Senate and the United States House of Representatives. It met in Washington, D.C. from March 4, 1829, to March 4, 1831, during the first two years of Andrew Jackson's presidency. The apportionment of seats in the House of Representatives was based on the 1820 United States census. Both chambers had a Jacksonian majority.

Major events

 March 4, 1829: Andrew Jackson became 7th President of the United States
 May 10–14, 1830: Confrontational meetings between the French Chargé d'affaires in Washington DC and a group of leaders consisting of Mark Alexander, William S. Archer, Robert H. Adams, Thomas Hinds, Dixon H. Lewis, Clement Comer Clay, Powhatan Ellis and John McKinley grew incredibly contentious and hostile. Arguments began when the aforementioned representatives and senators charged that France owed the United States reparations from damages incurred during the Quasi-War. At one point Thomas Hinds threatened the French Chargé d'affaires with a pistol. Eventually, only intervention by John Forsyth prevented a major diplomatic incident. Shortly after this the governor of Virginia John Floyd formally asked France's economic attaché to leave Virginia. This foreshadowed conflict with France over the same issue that would dominate American politics in 1835, at that point the main instigator on the American side would be President Andrew Jackson.
 May 28 – US congress passes the Indian Removal Act.
 September 27 – Treaty of Dancing Rabbit Creek with Choctaw nation. (First removal treaty signed after the Removal Act.)

Major legislation

May 28, 1830: Indian Removal Act, ch. 148,

Not enacted 

May 27, 1830: Maysville Road Bill vetoed

Treaties 
 September 27, 1830: The Treaty of Dancing Rabbit Creek, the first removal treaty after the passage of the Indian Removal Act, is signed with the Choctaw.
 February 24, 1831: Treaty of Dancing Rabbit Creek proclaimed.

Party summary
The count below identifies party affiliations at the beginning of the first session of this congress. Changes resulting from subsequent replacements are shown below in the "Changes in membership" section.

Senate

House of Representatives

Leadership

Senate 
 President: John C. Calhoun (J)
 President pro tempore: Samuel Smith (J)

House of Representatives 
 Speaker: Andrew Stevenson (J)

Members
This list is arranged by chamber, then by state. Senators are listed by class, and representatives are listed by district.

Skip to House of Representatives, below

Senate
Senators were elected by the state legislatures every two years, with one-third beginning new six-year terms with each Congress. Preceding the names in the list below are Senate class numbers, which indicate the cycle of their election. In this Congress, Class 1 meant their term began in the last Congress, facing re-election in 1832; Class 2 meant their term began with this Congress, facing re-election in 1834; and Class 3 meant their term ended with this Congress, facing re-election in 1830.

Alabama 
 2. William R. King (J)
 3. John McKinley (J)

Connecticut 
 1. Samuel A. Foot (NR)
 3. Calvin Willey (NR)

Delaware 
 1. Louis McLane (J), until April 16, 1829
 Arnold Naudain (NR), from January 7, 1830
 2. John M. Clayton (NR)

Georgia 
 2. George Troup (J)
 3. John M. Berrien (J), until March 9, 1829
 John Forsyth (J), from November 9, 1829

Illinois 
 2. John McLean (J), until October 14, 1830
 David J. Baker (J), November 12, 1830 – December 11, 1830
 John M. Robinson (J), from December 11, 1830
 3. Elias Kane (J)

Indiana 
 1. James Noble (NR), until February 26, 1831, vacant for remainder of term
 3. William Hendricks (NR)

Kentucky 
 2. George M. Bibb (J)
 3. John Rowan (J)

Louisiana 
 2. Edward Livingston (J)
 3. Josiah S. Johnston (NR)

Maine 
 1. John Holmes (NR)
 2. Peleg Sprague (NR)

Maryland 
 1. Samuel Smith (J)
 3. Ezekiel F. Chambers (NR)

Massachusetts 
 1. Daniel Webster (NR)
 2. Nathaniel Silsbee (NR)

Mississippi 
 1. Powhatan Ellis (J)
 2. Thomas B. Reed (J), until November 26, 1829
 Robert H. Adams (J), January 6, 1830 – July 2, 1830
 George Poindexter (J), from October 15, 1830

Missouri 
 1. Thomas H. Benton (J)
 3. David Barton (NR)

New Hampshire 
 2. Samuel Bell (NR)
 3. Levi Woodbury (J)

New Jersey 
 1. Mahlon Dickerson (J)
 2. Theodore Frelinghuysen (NR)

New York 
 1. Charles E. Dudley (J)
 3. Nathan Sanford (NR)

North Carolina 
 2. John Branch (J), until March 9, 1829
 Bedford Brown (J), from December 9, 1829
 3. James Iredell Jr. (J)

Ohio 
 1. Benjamin Ruggles (NR)
 3. Jacob Burnet (NR)

Pennsylvania 
 1. Isaac D. Barnard (J)
 3. William Marks (NR)

Rhode Island 
 1. Asher Robbins (NR)
 2. Nehemiah R. Knight (NR)

South Carolina 
 2. Robert Y. Hayne (J)
 3. William Smith (J)

Tennessee 
 1. John Eaton (J), until March 9, 1829
 Felix Grundy (J), from October 19, 1829
 2. Hugh Lawson White (J)

Vermont 
 1. Horatio Seymour (NR)
 3. Dudley Chase (NR)

Virginia 
 1. John Tyler (J)
 2. Littleton W. Tazewell (J)

House of Representatives
Members are listed by their districts.

Alabama 
 . Clement C. Clay (J)
 . Robert E. B. Baylor (J)
 . Dixon H. Lewis (J)

Connecticut 
All representatives were elected statewide on a general ticket.
 . Noyes Barber (NR)
 . William W. Ellsworth (NR)
 . Jabez W. Huntington (NR)
 . Ralph I. Ingersoll (NR)
 . William L. Storrs (NR)
 . Ebenezer Young (NR)

Delaware 
 . Kensey Johns Jr. (NR)

Georgia 
All representatives were elected statewide on a general ticket.
 . Thomas F. Foster (J)
 . Charles E. Haynes (J)
 . Henry G. Lamar (J), from December 7, 1829
 . Wilson Lumpkin (J)
 . Wiley Thompson (J)
 . James M. Wayne (J)
 . Richard Henry Wilde (J)

Illinois 
 . Joseph Duncan (J)

Indiana 
 . Ratliff Boon (J)
 . Jonathan Jennings (NR)
 . John Test (NR)

Kentucky 
 . Henry Daniel (J)
 . Nicholas D. Coleman (J)
 . James Clark (NR)
 . Robert P. Letcher (NR)
 . Richard M. Johnson (J)
 . Joseph Lecompte (J)
 . John Kincaid (J)
 . Nathan Gaither (J)
 . Charles A. Wickliffe (J)
 . Joel Yancey (J)
 . Thomas Chilton (J)
 . Chittenden Lyon (J)

Louisiana 
 . Edward D. White (NR)
 . Henry H. Gurley (NR)
 . Walter H. Overton (J)

Maine 
 . Rufus McIntire (J)
 . John Anderson (J)
 . Joseph F. Wingate (NR)
 . George Evans (NR), from July 20, 1829
 . James W. Ripley (J), until March 12, 1830
 Cornelius Holland (J), from December 6, 1830
 . Leonard Jarvis (J)
 . Samuel Butman (NR)

Maryland 
The 5th district was a plural district with two representatives.
 . Clement Dorsey (NR)
 . Benedict J. Semmes (NR)
 . George C. Washington (NR)
 . Michael C. Sprigg (J)
 . Elias Brown (J)
 . Benjamin C. Howard (J)
 . George E. Mitchell (J), from December 7, 1829
 . Richard Spencer (J)
 . Ephraim K. Wilson (J)

Massachusetts 
 . Benjamin Gorham (NR)
 . Benjamin W. Crowninshield (NR)
 . John Varnum (NR)
 . Edward Everett (NR)
 . John Davis (NR)
 . Joseph G. Kendall (NR)
 . George J. Grennell Jr. (NR)
 . Isaac C. Bates (NR)
 . Henry W. Dwight (NR)
 . John Bailey (NR)
 . Joseph Richardson (NR)
 . James L. Hodges (NR)
 . John Reed Jr. (NR)

Mississippi 
 . Thomas Hinds (J)

Missouri 
 . Spencer D. Pettis (J)

New Hampshire 
All representatives were elected statewide on a general ticket.
 . John Brodhead (J)
 . Thomas Chandler (J)
 . Joseph Hammons (J)
 . Jonathan Harvey (J)
 . Henry Hubbard (J)
 . John W. Weeks (J)

New Jersey 
All representatives were elected statewide on a general ticket.
 . Lewis Condict (NR)
 . Richard M. Cooper (NR)
 . Thomas H. Hughes (NR)
 . Isaac Pierson (NR)
 . James F. Randolph (NR)
 . Samuel Swan (NR)

New York 
There were three plural districts, the 20th & 26th had two representatives each, the 3rd had three representatives.
 . James Lent (J)
 . Jacob Crocheron (J)
 . Churchill C. Cambreleng (J)
 . Gulian C. Verplanck (J)
 . Campbell P. White (J)
 . Henry B. Cowles (NR)
 . Abraham Bockee (J)
 . Hector Craig (J), until July 12, 1830
 Samuel W. Eager (NR), from November 2, 1830
 . Charles G. DeWitt (J)
 . James Strong (NR)
 . John D. Dickinson (NR)
 . Ambrose Spencer (NR)
 . Perkins King (J)
 . Peter I. Borst (J)
 . William G. Angel (J)
 . Henry R. Storrs (NR)
 . Michael Hoffman (J)
 . Benedict Arnold (NR)
 . John W. Taylor (NR)
 . Henry C. Martindale (NR)
 . Isaac Finch (NR)
 . Joseph Hawkins (NR)
 . George Fisher (NR), until February 5, 1830
 Jonah Sanford (J), from November 3, 1830
 . Robert Monell (J), until February 21, 1831, vacant thereafter
 . Thomas Beekman (NR)
 . Jonas Earll Jr. (J)
 . Gershom Powers (J)
 . Thomas Maxwell (J)
 . Jehiel H. Halsey (J)
 . Robert S. Rose (Anti-M)
 . Timothy Childs (Anti-M)
 . John Magee (J)
 . Phineas L. Tracy (Anti-M)
 . Ebenezer F. Norton (J)

North Carolina 
 . William B. Shepard (NR)
 . Willis Alston (J)
 . Thomas H. Hall (J)
 . Jesse Speight (J)
 . Gabriel Holmes (J), until September 26, 1829
 Edward B. Dudley (J), from November 10, 1829
 . Robert Potter (J)
 . Edmund Deberry (NR)
 . Daniel L. Barringer (J)
 . Augustine H. Shepperd (J)
 . Abraham Rencher (J)
 . Henry W. Connor (J)
 . Samuel P. Carson (J)
 . Lewis Williams (NR)

Ohio 
 . James Findlay (J)
 . James Shields (J)
 . Joseph H. Crane (NR)
 . Joseph Vance (NR)
 . William Russell (J)
 . William Creighton Jr. (NR)
 . Samuel F. Vinton (NR)
 . William Stanbery (J)
 . William W. Irvin (J)
 . William Kennon Sr. (J)
 . John M. Goodenow (J), until April 9, 1830
 Humphrey H. Leavitt (J), from December 6, 1830
 . John Thomson (J)
 . Elisha Whittlesey (NR)
 . Mordecai Bartley (NR)

Pennsylvania 
There were six plural districts, the 7th, 8th, 11th & 16th had two representatives each, the 4th & 9th had three representatives each.
 . Joel B. Sutherland (J)
 . Joseph Hemphill (J)
 . Daniel H. Miller (J)
 . James Buchanan (J)
 . Joshua Evans Jr. (J)
 . George G. Leiper (J)
 . John B. Sterigere (J)
 . Innis Green (J)
 . Joseph Fry Jr. (J)
 . Henry A. P. Muhlenberg (J)
 . Samuel D. Ingham (J), until March 1829
 Peter Ihrie Jr. (J), from October 13, 1829
 . George Wolf (J), until March 1829
 Samuel A. Smith (J), from October 13, 1829
 . James Ford (J)
 . Alem Marr (J)
 . Philander Stephens (J)
 . Adam King (J)
 . Thomas H. Crawford (J)
 . William Ramsey (J)
 . John Scott (J)
 . Chauncey Forward (J)
 . Thomas Irwin (J)
 . William McCreery (J)
 . Harmar Denny (Anti-M), from December 15, 1829, after William Wilkins resigned before qualifying
 . John Gilmore (J)
 . Richard Coulter (J)
 . Thomas H. Sill (NR)

Rhode Island 
Both representatives were elected statewide on a general ticket.
 . Tristam Burges (NR)
 . Dutee J. Pearce (NR)

South Carolina 
 . William Drayton (J)
 . Robert W. Barnwell (J)
 . John Campbell (J)
 . William D. Martin (J)
 . George McDuffie (J)
 . Warren R. Davis (J)
 . William T. Nuckolls (J)
 . James Blair (J)
 . Starling Tucker (J)

Tennessee 
 . John Blair (J)
 . Pryor Lea (J)
 . James I. Standifer (J)
 . Jacob C. Isacks (J)
 . Robert Desha (J)
 . James K. Polk (J)
 . John Bell (J)
 . Cave Johnson (J)
 . David Crockett (NR)

Vermont 
 . Jonathan Hunt (NR)
 . Rollin C. Mallary (NR)
 . Horace Everett (NR)
 . Benjamin Swift (NR)
 . William Cahoon (Anti-M)

Virginia 
 . Thomas Newton Jr. (NR), until March 9, 1830
 George Loyall (J), from March 9, 1830
 . James Trezvant (J)
 . William S. Archer (J)
 . Mark Alexander (J)
 . Thomas T. Bouldin (J)
 . Thomas Davenport (J)
 . Nathaniel H. Claiborne (J)
 . Richard Coke Jr. (J)
 . Andrew Stevenson (J)
 . William C. Rives (J), until April 17, 1829
 William F. Gordon (J), from January 25, 1830
 . Philip P. Barbour (J), until October 15, 1830
 John M. Patton (J), from November 25, 1830
 . John Roane (J)
 . John Taliaferro (NR)
 . Charles F. Mercer (NR)
 . John S. Barbour (J)
 . William Armstrong (NR)
 . Robert Allen (J)
 . Philip Doddridge (NR)
 . William McCoy (J)
 . Robert Craig (J)
 . Lewis Maxwell (NR)
 . Alexander Smyth (J), until April 17, 1830
 Joseph Draper (J), from December 6, 1830

Non-voting members 
 . Ambrose H. Sevier
 . Joseph M. White
 . John Biddle, until February 21, 1831, vacant thereafter

Changes in membership
The count below reflects changes from the beginning of the first session of this Congress.

Senate 
Replacements: 4
 Jacksonians (J): no net change
 National Republicans (NR): no net change
Deaths: 4
Resignations: 4
Interim appointments: 1
Total seats with changes: 7

|-
| Georgia(3)
|  | John M. Berrien (J)
| style="font-size:80%" | Resigned March 9, 1829, to become U.S. Attorney General.Successor elected November 9, 1829.
|  | John Forsyth (J)
| Installed November 9, 1829

|-
| North Carolina(2)
|  | John Branch (J)
| style="font-size:80%" | Resigned March 9, 1829, after being appointed U.S. Secretary of the Navy.Successor elected December 9, 1829.
|  | Bedford Brown (J)
| Installed December 9, 1829

|-
| Tennessee(1)
|  | John Eaton (J)
| style="font-size:80%" | Resigned March 9, 1829, after being appointed U.S. Secretary of War.Successor elected October 19, 1829.
|  | Felix Grundy (J)
| Installed October 19, 1829

|-
| Delaware(1)
|  | Louis McLane (J)
| style="font-size:80%" | Resigned April 29, 1829, to become U.S. Envoy Extraordinary and Minister Plenipotentiary to the United Kingdom.Successor elected January 7, 1830.
|  | Arnold Naudain (NR)
| Installed January 7, 1830

|-
| Mississippi(2)
|  | Thomas B. Reed (J)
| style="font-size:80%" | Died November 26, 1829.Successor elected January 6, 1830.
|  | Robert H. Adams (J)
| Installed January 6, 1830

|-
| Mississippi(2)
|  | Robert H. Adams (J)
| style="font-size:80%" | Died July 2, 1830.Successor appointed October 15, 1830, to continue the term, and subsequently elected.
|  | George Poindexter (J)
| Installed October 15, 1830

|-
| Illinois(2)
|  | John McLean (J)
| style="font-size:80%" | Died October 14, 1830.Successor appointed November 12, 1830, to continue the term.
|  | David J. Baker (J)
| Installed November 12, 1830

|-
| Illinois(2)
|  | David J. Baker (J)
| style="font-size:80%" | Appointee retired with elected successor qualified.Successor elected December 11, 1830.
|  | John M. Robinson (J)
| Installed December 11, 1830

|-
| Indiana(1)
|  | James Noble (NR)
| style="font-size:80%" | Died February 26, 1831.Seat filled next Congress.
| Vacant
| Not filled this Congress

|}

House of Representatives 
Replacements: 5
 Jacksonians (J): 1 seat net loss
 National Republicans (NR): 1 seat net gain
Deaths: 2
Resignations: 10
Contested election: 2
Total seats with changes: 15

|-
| 
| Vacant
| style="font-size:80%" | Maryland elected its members October 5, 1829 after the term began but before Congress convened. Rep-elect sworn in December after convening.
|  | George Edward Mitchell (J)
| Seated December 7, 1829
|-
| 
| Vacant
| style="font-size:80%" | George Gilmer (Jacksonian) was redistricted from the 1st district and re-elected but failed to accept the position within the legal time frame. Governor ordered a new election.
|  | Henry G. Lamar (J)
| Seated December 7, 1829
|-
| 
| Vacant
| style="font-size:80%" | Peleg Sprague resigned in previous Congress
|  | George Evans (NR)
| Seated July 20, 1829
|-
| 
| Vacant
| style="font-size:80%" | William Wilkins resigned before qualifying
|  | Harmar Denny (AM)
| Seated December 15, 1829
|-
| 
|  | George Wolf (J)
| style="font-size:80%" | Resigned in 1829 before the convening of Congress
|  | Samuel A. Smith (J)
| Seated October 13, 1829
|-
| 
|  | William C. Rives (J)
| style="font-size:80%" | Resigned some time in 1829
|  | William F. Gordon (J)
| Seated January 25, 1830
|-
| 
|  | Samuel D. Ingham (J)
| style="font-size:80%" | Resigned in March 1829 after being appointed Secretary of the Treasury
|  | Peter Ihrie Jr. (J)
| Seated October 13, 1829
|-
| 
|  | Gabriel Holmes (J)
| style="font-size:80%" | Died September 26, 1829
|  | Edward B. Dudley (J)
| Seated November 10, 1829
|-
| 
|  | George Fisher (NR)
| style="font-size:80%" | Lost contested election February 5, 1830, to Silas Wright who in turn failed to qualify
|  | Jonah Sanford (J)
| Seated November 3, 1830
|-
| 
|  | Thomas Newton Jr. (NR)
| style="font-size:80%" | Lost contested election March 9, 1830
|  | George Loyall (J)
| Seated March 9, 1830
|-
| 
|  | James W. Ripley (J)
| style="font-size:80%" | Resigned March 12, 1830
|  | Cornelius Holland (J)
| Seated December 6, 1830
|-
| 
|  | John M. Goodenow (J)
| style="font-size:80%" | Resigned April 9, 1830, after being appointed judge of the Supreme Court of Ohio
|  | Humphrey H. Leavitt (J)
| Seated December 6, 1830
|-
| 
|  | Alexander Smyth (J)
| style="font-size:80%" | Died April 17, 1830
|  | Joseph Draper (J)
| Seated December 6, 1830
|-
| 
|  | Hector Craig (J)
| style="font-size:80%" | Resigned July 12, 1830
|  | Samuel W. Eager (NR)
| Seated November 2, 1830
|-
| 
|  | Philip P. Barbour (J)
| style="font-size:80%" | Resigned October 15, 1830, after being appointed judge of US Circuit Court of the Eastern District of Virginia
|  | John M. Patton (J)
| Seated November 25, 1830
|-
| 
|  | Robert Monell (J)
| style="font-size:80%" |Resigned February 21, 1831
| Vacant
| Not filled this term
|-
| 
| John Biddle
| style="font-size:80%" | Resigned February 21, 1831
| Vacant
| Not filled this term
|}

Committees
Lists of committees and their party leaders.

Senate

 Accounts of James Monroe (Select)
 Agriculture (Chairman: William Marks)
 Amending the Constitution on the Election of the President and Vice President (Select)
 Audit and Control the Contingent Expenses of the Senate (Chairman: Elias Kane then James Iredell)
 Claims (Chairman: Benjamin Ruggles)
 Commerce (Chairman: Levi Woodbury)
 Distributing Public Revenue Among the States (Select)
 District of Columbia (Chairman: Ezekiel F. Chambers)
 Dueling (Select)
 Engrossed Bills (Chairman: William Marks)
 Finance (Chairman: Samuel Smith)
 Foreign Relations (Chairman: Littleton Tazewell)
 French Spoilations (Select)
 Impeachment of James H. Peck (Select)
 Indian Affairs (Chairman: Hugh Lawson White)
 Judiciary (Chairman: John Rowan) 
 Manufactures (Chairman: Mahlon Dickerson)
 Memorial of the Manufacturers Iron (Select)
 Mileage of Members of Congress (Select)
 Military Affairs (Chairman: Thomas Hart Benton)
 Militia (Chairman: Isaac D. Barnard)
 Naval Affairs (Chairman: Robert Y. Hayne)
 Nomination of Amos Kendall (Select)
 Pensions (Chairman: John Holmes)
 Post Office Department (Select)
 Post Office and Post Roads (Chairman: George M. Bibb)
 Private Land Claims (Chairman: Jacob Burnet)
 Public Lands (Chairman: David Barton)
 Roads and Canals (Select) (Chairman: William Hendricks)
Tariff Regulation (Select)
 Whole

House of Representatives

 Accounts (Chairman: Jehiel H. Halsey)
 Agriculture (Chairman: Ambrose Spencer)
 American Colonization Society (Select)
 Claims (Chairman: Elisha Whittlesey)
 Commerce (Chairman: Churchill C. Cambreleng)
 District of Columbia (Chairman: Gershom Powers)
 Elections (Chairman: Willis Alston)
 Establishing an Assay Office in the Gold Region (Select)
 Expenditures in the Navy Department (Chairman: Augustine H. Shepperd)
 Expenditures in the Post Office Department (Chairman: Joel Yancey)
 Expenditures in the State Department (Chairman: Jonas Earll)
 Expenditures in the Treasury Department (Chairman: George G. Leiper)
 Expenditures in the War Department (Chairman: Lewis Maxwell)
 Expenditures on Public Buildings (Chairman: Michael C. Sprigg)
 Foreign Affairs (Chairman: William S. Archer)
 Indian Affairs (Chairman: John Bell)
 Judiciary (Chairman: James Buchanan)
 Manufactures (Chairman: Rollin C. Mallary)
 Military Affairs (Chairman: William Drayton)
 Military Pensions (Chairman: Isaac C. Bates)
 Naval Affairs (Chairman: Michael Hoffman)
 Post Office and Post Roads (Chairman: Richard M. Johnson)
 Private Land Claims (Chairman: John B. Sterigere)
 Public Expenditures (Chairman: Thomas H. Hall)
 Public Lands (Chairman: Jacob C. Isacks then Charles A. Wickliffe)
 Revisal and Unfinished Business (Chairman: Dutee J. Pearce)
 Revolutionary Claims (Chairman: Tristam Burges)
 Revolutionary Pensions (Chairman: N/A)
 Rules (Select)
 Standards of Official Conduct
 Territories (Chairman: James Clark)
 Ways and Means (Chairman: George McDuffie)
 Whole

Joint committees

 Enrolled Bills
 The Library

Employees

Legislative branch agency directors 
Architect of the Capitol: Charles Bulfinch, until June 25, 1829 (office abolished)
Librarian of Congress: John Silva Meehan

Senate 
Chaplain: William Ryland (Methodist), until December 14, 1829
 Henry V. Johns (Episcopalian), elected December 14, 1829
Secretary: Walter Lowrie
Sergeant at Arms: Mountjoy Bayly

House of Representatives 
 Chaplain: Reuben Post (Presbyterian), until December 13, 1830
 Ralph R. Gurley (Presbyterian), elected December 13, 1830
 Clerk: Matthew St. Clair Clarke
 Doorkeeper: Benjamin Birch
 Reading Clerks: 
 Sergeant at Arms: John O. Dunn

See also 
 1828 United States elections (elections leading to this Congress)
 1828 United States presidential election
 1828–29 United States Senate elections
 1828–29 United States House of Representatives elections
 1830 United States elections (elections during this Congress, leading to the next Congress)
 1830–31 United States Senate elections
 1830–31 United States House of Representatives elections

Notes

References

External links
From American Memory at the Library of Congress:
Statutes at Large, 1789-1875
Senate Journal, First Forty-three Sessions of Congress
House Journal, First Forty-three Sessions of Congress
 
Other U.S. government websites:
House Document No. 108-222 from the Biographical Directory of the United States Congress (1774–2005)
House History from the U.S. House of Representatives
Statistics and Lists from the U.S. Senate